Baisha Subdistrict is a subdistrict in Pengjiang District, Jiangmen, Guangdong, China. , it has 52 residential communities under its administration.

See also 
 List of township-level divisions of Guangdong

References 

Township-level divisions of Guangdong
Jiangmen